The Precious Seed is a 1948 Soviet drama film directed by Iosif Kheifits and Aleksandr Zarkhi.

Plot 
To prepare the thesis, the young journalist is sent to the district. Here the heroine is to independently release several issues of the newspaper, get acquainted with new people, understand their actions and in themselves.

Cast 
 Galina Kozhakina
 Boris Zhukovsky
 Oleg Zhakov
 Pavel Kadochnikov
 Vasili Vanin
 Valentina Telegina
 Pyotr Aleynikov
 Rostislav Plyatt	
 Pavel Olenev
 Olga Aroseva
 Sergey Filippov
 Lyudmila Shabalina
 Nikolai Dorokhin
 Vladimir Kazarinov
 Aleksandr Melnikov
 Viktor Khokhryakov
 Sergey Filippov
 Tatyana Pelttser

References

External links 
 

1948 films
Soviet drama films
1940s Russian-language films
Films directed by Aleksandr Zarkhi
Films directed by Iosif Kheifits
1948 drama films
Lenfilm films
Soviet black-and-white films